Zhang Yan (1917 – 3 August 2003) was a major general (shaojiang) of the People's Liberation Army (PLA) who served as president of the National University of Defense Technology from 1978 to 1983. He was a member of the 6th and 7th National Committee of the Chinese People's Political Consultative Conference.

Biography
Zhang was born Zhang Jiankai in Lingbi County, Anhui, in 1917, while his ancestral home in Tengzhou, Shandong. In 1928, he attended Liji Primary School. Influenced by teacher and Communist Wang Jianmin, he joined the Student Counter Japanese Volunteer Army. In 1937, he was admitted to Counter-Japanese Military and Political University. He joined the Chinese Communist Party (CCP) in February 1938. He fought under Liu Bocheng and Deng Xiaoping at the Battle of North Henan in 1943 during the Second Sino-Japanese War. In September 1948, he became deputy director of the Political Department of Zhongyuan Military and Political University, he remained at there until June 1949, when he took office as director of the Propaganda and Education Division of the Political Department of the Second Field Army Military and Political University.

After the founding of the Communist State in 1949, Zhang participated in the preparatory work of Harbin Institute of Military Engineering and served as director of its Political Department. He was promoted to the rank of major general (Shaojiang) in 1961. In October 1965, he was made political commissar of Xi'an Military Telecommunication Engineering College. During the Cultural Revolution, he was brought to be persecuted and suffered political persecution. He was named party secretary of Northwest Institute of Telecommunication Engineering in October 1973 and then party secretary of the Tenth Research Institute of the Ministry of Defense in July 1976. In July 1977, he became deputy director of the State Planning Commission. In September 1978, he was appointed president of National University of Defense Technology, and served until December 1983, when he was transferred to the Central Military Commission. He retired in July 1998. On 3 August 2003, he died from an illness in Beijing, aged 86.

References

1917 births
2003 deaths
People from Lingbi County
Counter-Japanese Military and Political University alumni
Presidents of the National University of Defense Technology
People's Liberation Army generals from Anhui
People's Republic of China politicians from Anhui
Chinese Communist Party politicians from Anhui
Members of the 6th Chinese People's Political Consultative Conference
Members of the 7th Chinese People's Political Consultative Conference